Parsons-Taylor House is a historic home located in Easton, Pennsylvania.  It was built between 1753 and 1757, and is a -story, 2 bay stone dwelling in the Georgian style.  The interior features a three-part circular stairway that connects the four levels of the home. The house was built for William Parsons and later inhabited by Founding Father George Taylor (c. 1716–1781), and he died there in 1781.  

The house has been occupied by the George Taylor Chapter of the Daughters of the American Revolution since 1906.

It was added to the National Register of Historic Places in 1980.

References

External links
 Parsons-Taylor House, South Fourth & Ferry Streets, Easton, Northampton County, PA: 1 photo and 2 data pages, at Historic American Buildings Survey
George Taylor Chapter NSDAR, Easton, Pennsylvania website
 City of Easton historical buildings.

Houses on the National Register of Historic Places in Pennsylvania
Georgian architecture in Pennsylvania
Houses completed in 1757
Houses in Northampton County, Pennsylvania
National Register of Historic Places in Northampton County, Pennsylvania
1757 establishments in Pennsylvania
Individually listed contributing properties to historic districts on the National Register in Pennsylvania